The A13 motorway is a road in Portugal connecting Santarém to the southward turn of the A2.

References

Motorways in Portugal